Glacia may refer to:

Pokémon characters
 Glacia (Pokémon), an Elite Four member
 Glaceon, (Japanese Glacia), it can freeze its own moisture

See also
 Glacier, a persistent body of moving ice